Looney Tunes: Space Race is a 2000 kart-racing video game published by Infogrames for the Dreamcast and developed through Infogrames' own Melbourne House studio. A version of Nintendo 64 was developed, but it was never released. It was ported to PlayStation 2 in 2002 (under the name "Space Race") with a new tournament mode and different soundtrack.

Reception 

Evan Shamoon reviewed the Dreamcast version of the game for Next Generation, rating it three stars out of five, and stated that "Despite one frustrating design decision, this is a beautifully presented and eminently likable game – and easily the best kart racer on Dreamcast."

The Dreamcast version was met with positive reviews upon release while the PlayStation 2 version received mixed reviews. GameRankings and Metacritic gave it a score of 77.77% and 83 out of 100 for the Dreamcast version, and 62.63% and 62 out of 100 for the PlayStation 2 version.

References

External links 
 
 

2000 video games
Dreamcast games
Kart racing video games
PlayStation 2 games
Science fiction video games
Cancelled Nintendo 64 games
Video games based on Looney Tunes
Video games with cel-shaded animation
Video games developed in Australia
Infogrames games
Cartoon Network video games
Multiplayer and single-player video games